The Remains of Taipei Prison Wall are located in Zhongzheng District, Taipei, Taiwan at the end of Aiguo East Road and Jinshan South Road adjacent to the Southern Taipei operations center for Chunghwa Telecom.  Approximately 100 meters of wall exist on both sides of the Chunghwa Telecom property.  The walls were built during Japanese rule.

Background

In response to continuous anti-Japanese uprisings throughout the early period of Japanese rule in 1895–1945, the Japanese colonial government built large-scale prisons in Taihoku and Tainan Prefecture to hold political prisoners. The remains of the Taihoku prison serve as a tangible witness to modern Taiwanese prison history.

The layout was based on a radial floor plan, a standard prison design of the 19th century. The prison walls were made with stones from the Old Taipei City Wall, built by the Qing Dynasty at the end of the 19th century.  The stones were carved completely by hand from the quartzose sandstone quarries in the Dazhi (大直) and Neihu areas of Taipei.

World War II Allied prisoners

During the period of 1944–1945, Allied airmen who had been shot down or crashed while on patrols over Taiwan were held in the Taipei Prison by the Japanese Army.  On 29 May 1945, 14 of these allied airmen were given a mock trial and sentenced to death.  The execution took place inside the prison courtyard only 58 days before the end of World War II.  When the war ended, the rest of the men were released and returned home.

See also

 Taipei Prison
 Aerial Battle of Taiwan-Okinawa
 Taiwan under Japanese rule
 Raid on Taipei

External links

Taipei Times
POW Taiwan
Taiwan’s darker past: Emerging histories of the World-war II prisoner of war camps

Buildings and structures in Taipei
History of Taipei
Pacific Ocean theatre of World War II
Walls in Taiwan